"Did You Know That There's a Tunnel Under Ocean Blvd" is a song recorded by American singer-songwriter Lana Del Rey, taken from her ninth studio album of the same name (2023).  It was released as the lead single from the album on December 7, 2022, alongside the album's announcement and preorder. The song peaked at number 23 on the Billboard US Hot Rock & Alternative Songs chart.

Background and release
The song was written by Del Rey and Mike Hermosa, with whom she also co-produced it with, alongside Jack Antonoff, Drew Erickson, and Zach Dawes. The track is a slow dreamy ballad described as baroque orchestral pop.

In an interview with Billie Eilish for Interview, Del Rey revealed that "Did You Know That There's a Tunnel Under Ocean Blvd" was the first song written for its parent album of the same name. She also shared that the song and title were inspired by a sealed tunnel under the Jergins Trust Building in Long Beach, California, and a 1974 track by Harry Nilsson titled "Don't Forget Me". She had read that "the [tunnel's beautiful] mosaic ceilings were still perfectly preserved, but no one could get in", and was compelled to write a song inspired by Nilsson's track using her own metaphors.

Critical reception
Sam Sodomsky of Pitchfork described the song as a "slow, dreamy ballad filled" with "incidental moments" and found the tunnel in the title to be "less a geographic focal point than a window into the potential she sees in the most familiar scenes and well-traveled routes".

Personnel
Credits are adapted from Tidal.

 Lana Del Rey – producer, vocalist, background vocalist, composer, lyricist
 Mike Hermosa – producer, composer, lyricist, acoustic guitar
 Jack Antonoff – producer, drums, electric guitar, synth bassist, programmer, mixer
 Drew Erickson – producer, conductor, string arranger, piano, synth bass
 Zach Dawes – producer
 Jim Keltner – drums
 Benji Lysaght – acoustic guitar, sound effects
 Christine Kim – cello
 Jake Braun – cello
 Logan Hone – clarinet
 Charlie Bisharat – violin
 Andrew Bulbrook – violin
 Wynton Grant – violin
 Paul J. Cartwright – violin
 Vonciele Faggett – background vocalist
 Melodye Perry – background vocalist
 Shikena Jones – background vocalist
 Laura Sisk – engineer, mixer
 Michael Harris – engineer
 Dean Reid – engineer
 Bill Mims – assistant recording engineer
 Jon Sher – assistant recording engineer
 Mark Aguilar – assistant recording engineer
 Ben Fletcher – assistant recording engineer
 Matt Tuggle – assistant recording engineer
 Ruairi O'Flaherty – assistant recording engineer
 Brian Rajaratnam – assistant recording engineer
 Ivan Handwerk – assistant recording engineer
 Megan Searl – assistant recording engineer

Charts

References

2020s ballads
2022 songs
2022 singles
Lana Del Rey songs
Pop ballads
Interscope Records singles
Polydor Records singles
Songs written by Lana Del Rey
Songs written by Jack Antonoff
Song recordings produced by Jack Antonoff
Song recordings produced by Lana Del Rey